The 2019 Individual Speedway World Championship Grand Prix Qualification was a series of motorcycle speedway meetings that were used to determine the three riders that qualified for the 2019 Speedway Grand Prix. The series consisted of four qualifying rounds at Žarnovica, Slangerup, Lonigo and Abensberg and the Grand Prix Challenge at Landshut. The three riders that qualified were Janusz Kołodziej, Niels-Kristian Iversen and Antonio Lindbäck.

Qualifying rounds

Final 
{| width=100%
|width=50% valign=top|

Grand Prix Challenge 
28 July 2018
 Landshut
 Lambert, Pawlicki, Smolinski and Milík were nominated as wildcards.

See also 
 2018 Speedway Grand Prix

References 

2018 in speedway
Qualification
Speedway Grand Prix Qualifications